Battle of Kinburn may refer to several battles fought at Kinburn:

Battle of Kinburn (1787), part of the Russo-Turkish War
Battle of Kinburn (1855), a naval engagement during the Crimean War